Lorenzo Sebastiani (28 September 1988 – 6 April 2009) was an Italian rugby union player who played prop for L'Aquila Rugby.

Rugby career 
Sebastiani was born in Aquila, Abruzzo, and entered the youth team of the local L'Aquila Rugby in 2005.
As a newcomer in the National U-18 squad in 2005, he took part to the FIRA youth European Championship getting the 3rd place, and then, with the Under-19 team, won the Division B World Championship category.
On 23 December 2007 he made his debut in serie A, against Rugby Badia.

Earthquake and memorial
At the moment of his death Sebastiani was a guest of a teammate.
The house was shaken by the earthquake that hit L'Aquila on 6 April 2009 and he died when the house collapsed.

In his memory the Italian Rugby Federation named after him the Centre- and Southern Italy's branch of the Youth Rugby Academy which is based in Rome.

Dedications to Lorenzo Sebastiani include:
 2009 : Indoor stadium of Rocca di Mezzo "Lorenzo Sebastiani"
 since 2011 : Annual rugby memorial tournament "Lorenzo Sebastiani" in L'Aquila 
2013 : A park in San Donà di Piave, in Veneto, has been renamed Parco Lorenzo Sebastiani.

References 

Italian rugby union players
People from L'Aquila
1988 births
2009 deaths
Rugby union props
Sportspeople from the Province of L'Aquila